The Promax Awards (also known as the PromaxBDA Awards) honor promotion, design, and marketing by a company or individual that is broadcast, published, or released in their respective markets.

Promax International/BPME (branded as "Promax") sponsors awards competitions at the global level, as well as in North America, Latin America, Europe, the United Kingdom, Africa, Asia, India, and Australia & New Zealand. There is also a competition at the local level in the United States and Canada.

The awards categories include network TV, TV stations, cable networks, cable systems, network radio, radio stations, syndication distributors, and interactive media. At one point, they also included the Brandon Tartikoff Award, although it has not been awarded in several years.

Winners in the past have included FX Networks, Showtime, Red Bee Media, HBO, A&E Networks, 4Creative, Les Télécréateurs Paris, Rogers Media, and Bell Media Agency.

The Promax Global Excellence and North America Awards are handed out each year at Promax's annual conference, now in its 63rd year in 2019. The conference in June is typically held in Los Angeles at the JW Marriott at L.A. live or New York at the New York Hilton Midtown hotel. The Promax Awards at Station Summit honoring local station marketing are handed out in late June at the annual Promax Station Summit event at the Mirage in Las Vegas.

Promax and Broadcast Design Association
Promax was established in 1956 as a non-profit association for promotion and marketing professionals working in broadcast media. In 1997, the Broadcast Design Association (BDA) who had partnered with Promax for years on their annual conference, officially joined with Promax.

The PromaxBDA awards replaced earlier awards presented separately by Promax and the Broadcast Designers Association (BDA). Thousands of PromaxBDA awards have been presented to companies and individuals whose work is judged by a panel of promotion and marketing professionals using three measures: overall creativity, production quality, and results in achieving marketing objectives.

PromaxBDA
Promax International/BPME, branded as Promax, is a California not-for-profit corporation operating as a professional association. Based in Los Angeles, with a branch office in Singapore. Promax describes itself as "the global association for the entertainment marketing industry, representing thousands of people who create, market, and distribute content in media." Founded in the United States in 1956 as the Broadcast Promotion Association (BPA), in 1985, the organization changed its name to Broadcast Promotion & Marketing Executives (BPME). In 1993, the organization again changed its name to PROMAX (a loose acronym for Promotion and Marketing Executives). A merger with the Broadcast Design Association (BDA) in 1997 created the current association: PromaxBDA. The legal name for the group, which has 501(c)6 status from the IRS, is Promax International BPME.

The association holds conferences, award competitions and prints publications  for their members, and present networking opportunities. Steve Kazanjian is the current President & CEO. The Board of Directors is composed of senior entertainment marketing executives, and is currently chaired by Steph Sebbag, CEO of Los Angeles-based creative agency BPG. Previous Promax chairs include Joe Earley, head of marketing for Disney+, (formerly COO, Fox Television Group, Lisa Gregorian, President & CMO, Warner Bros. Television Group, Adam Stotsky, Pres. and GM, E!, and Mike Benson, Head of Marketing, Amazon Prime Video.

Promax publishes The Daily Brief newsletter.

References

External links
 PromaxBDA website

Advertising awards
Television awards
Awards established in 1956
Organizations established in 1956
1956 establishments in the United States
1997 mergers and acquisitions
Television organizations
Organizations based in Los Angeles
Organisations based in Singapore